The Roman Catholic Diocese of Kinkala is a diocese located in the city of Kinkala  in the ecclesiastical province of Brazzaville in the Republic of the Congo.

History
On October 3, 1987, the diocese was established from the Metropolitan Archdiocese of Brazzaville.

Bishops

Ordinaries, in reverse chronological order
 Bishop Ildevert Mathurin Mouanga (March 5, 2020 – present)
 Bishop Louis Portella Mbuyu (October 16, 2001 – March 5, 2020)
 Bishop Anatole Milandou (October 3, 1987 – January 23, 2001), appointed Archbishop of Brazzaville

Other priest of this diocese who became bishop
Bienvenu Manamika Bafouakouahou, appointed Bishop of Dolisie in 2013

See also
List of Catholic dioceses in the Republic of the Congo
Roman Catholicism in the Republic of the Congo

References

External links
 GCatholic.org
 Catholic Hierarchy 

Kinkala
Roman Catholic dioceses in the Republic of the Congo
Christian organizations established in 1987
Roman Catholic dioceses and prelatures established in the 20th century
Roman Catholic Ecclesiastical Province of Brazzaville
Roman Catholic bishops of Kinkala